PBS, the Public Broadcasting Service is a nonprofit television service in the US.

PBS may also refer to:

Broadcasting
PBS Kids, which broadcasts most of PBS' original children's programs.
 PBS America, UK derivative of PBS
 PBS 106.7FM, a community radio station in Melbourne, Australia
 Pacific Broadcasting System, a Filipino radio network
 Palestine Broadcasting Service (1936–1948), British Mandate for Palestine
 People's Broadcasting Service a Filipino radio network, managed by Bombo Radyo Philippines
 Philippine Broadcasting Service, a Filipino government-owned radio network
 Progressive Broadcasting System (early 1950s), a defunct American radio network
 Public Broadcasting Services, Malta
 Thai Public Broadcasting Service, Thai TV station

Science and technology
 Lead(II) sulfide (PbS), an inorganic compound
 Phosphate-buffered saline, a buffer solution commonly used in biological research
 Polarizing beam splitter, a component in experimental optics 
 Polybutylene succinate, a synthetic polyester
 Positive behavior support, a substantiated form of applied behavior analysis
 Primer binding site, a region of a nucleotide sequence
 Sodium perborate (NaH2BO4), a white, odorless, water-soluble chemical compound

Computing
 Portable Batch System, a computer software that performs job scheduling
 Preferential bidding system, a computer system for employee work-duty bidding
 Proxmox Backup Server, backup solution

Organizations
 Pacific Bulb Society
 Pakistan Bureau of Statistics
 Parti Bersatu Sabah, a Malaysian political party
 PBS Velká Bíteš, a Czech aircraft engine company
 Pink Boots Society, supporting women working in brewing
 Public Buildings Service of the US General Services Administration
 Swiss Guide and Scout Movement
 Prayer Book Society of Canada
 Prayer Book Society of the USA or PBS USA
 Privatbanen Sønderjylland, a former Danish railway operator

Other uses
 Positive Black Soul, a Senegalese hip-hop group
 Pharmaceutical Benefits Scheme, Australia, subsidising medicines
 Product breakdown structure, a project-management tool

See also
 PBS13, a violent street gang in Los Angeles, California, US